Cabiri is a town and commune in the municipality of Ícolo e Bengo, Luanda Province, Angola.

Transport 
It has a terminal station of a branch line of the Luanda Railway of the national railway system.

See also 
 Railway stations in Angola

References

Communes in Luanda Province
Populated places in Luanda Province